The canton of Souvigny is a French administrative division in the French department of Allier and region Auvergne-Rhône-Alpes. At the French canton reorganisation which came into effect in March 2015, the canton was expanded from 11 to 29 communes:
 
Agonges 
Autry-Issards 
Besson 
Bransat
Bresnay 
Bressolles
Cesset
Châtel-de-Neuvre
Châtillon
Chemilly 
Contigny
Cressanges
Deux-Chaises
Gipcy 
Laféline
Marigny 
Meillard
Meillers 
Monétay-sur-Allier
Le Montet
Noyant-d'Allier 
Rocles
Saint-Menoux 
Saint-Sornin
Souvigny  
Le Theil
Treban
Tronget
Verneuil-en-Bourbonnais

References

Souvigny